The Cal Poly Pomona College of Business Administration is the business college at California State Polytechnic University, Pomona (Cal Poly Pomona) located in Pomona, California, United States. The College of Business Administration educates students in technical and managerial competence necessary for successful performance in business, industry, government and education. CBA is accredited by AACSB International.

Admissions

Student clubs
Finance Society, aims to bring students, faculty, alumni, and industry professionals together through many diverse activities. Their mission is to assist finance students by providing them with the opportunities to acquire social and professional growth, networking and leadership skills, industry contacts, professional advice, experience, and occupation.
Bronco Makers Club, is a multi-disciplinary organization for young entrepreneurs based at Cal Poly Pomona.
FAST, which stands for "Forensics And Security Technology" is an organization focused on methods of digital forensics and cyber security spanning over any devices or operating systems currently available.  FAST is the official Cal Poly Pomona student chapter of the "High Technology Crime Investigation Association" (HTCIA), which is directly affiliated with digital forensics and cyber crimes in government and law enforcement globally.  FAST is open to all students with an interest in digital forensics and cyber security.
SWIFT, short for Students With an Interest in the Future of Technology, is Cal Poly Pomona's organization of professionals and students interested in cyber security and systems/network administration. SWIFT is also a registered DEF CON group known as DC-CPP.
MISSA, short for Management Information Systems Student Association, is the largest student organization at Cal Poly Pomona. The club was started by Computer Information Systems students as a chapter of ISACA which is open to all students. MISSA was formed to expose students to IT professionals, computing workshops, and social gatherings.
ATOMS short for the Association of Technology and Operations Management Students, ATOMS exists to cultivate interest and foster growth in the diverse fields of Technology and Operations Management (TOM). ATOMS offers many opportunities for members to better educate themselves in their field, network with industry leaders, strengthen their communication skills, and gain the support of other TOM majors. By bringing in industry guest speakers, planning company tours, and offering a variety of networking opportunities, ATOMS is dedicated to providing students with a strong social and academic foundation to smoothly transition to the working world.
Delta Sigma Pi was a coed professional business fraternity with over 220,000 collegiate and alumni members around the country.  Originally chartered on campus in 1969.  Before 1989 Delta Sigma Pi was an all-male fraternity at Cal Poly and very active on campus.  The organization was formally rechartered in 2001 and has since grown to be one of the larger organizations in the college.  As a business fraternity, students eligible to pledge and ultimately join must be majoring in any major within the College of Business, Economics, Food Marketing and Agribusiness, Apparel Merchandising and Management, or Hotel and Restaurant Management.  Events focus on developing professionalism, encouraging networking, fostering friendships, and serving the community.
The American Marketing Association The American Marketing Association goal is to foster students' marketing, advertising, and promotional skills and prepare them for the business environment. We look forward to enhancing students holistically by exposing them to academic, hands on, professional, philanthropic, and social events. We believe that collaboration, hard work, relationship building, and camaraderie are imperative in order for our organization to grow successfully.

References

External links
 

California State Polytechnic University, Pomona
Business schools in California